Joseph Edward Duncan III (February 25, 1963 – March 28, 2021) was an American convicted serial killer and child molester who was on death row in federal prison in conjunction with the 2005 kidnappings and murders of members of the Groene family of Coeur d'Alene, Idaho. He was also serving 11 consecutive sentences of life without parole in conjunction with the same crimes as well as the 1997 murder of Anthony Martinez of Beaumont, California. Additionally, Duncan confessed to — but had not been charged with — the 1996 murder of two girls, Sammiejo White and Carmen Cubias, in Seattle, Washington. At the time of the attack on the Groene family, Duncan was on the run from a child molestation charge in Minnesota.

Growing up in Tacoma, Washington, Duncan had a criminal history dating to when he was 15 years old. In 1980, he was sentenced to 20 years in prison for sexually assaulting a boy in Tacoma and as a result had spent all but eight years of his adult life in prison. He was paroled in 1994 but was returned to prison in 1997 for violating the terms of his parole.

In May 2005, Kootenai County, Idaho, authorities discovered the bodies of Brenda Groene, her boyfriend, and her 13-year-old son in the family home near Coeur d'Alene. Authorities also noted that Groene's two other children were missing: Shasta, aged 8, and Dylan, aged 9. After an intense search for the two children, Shasta was found alive with Duncan at a restaurant in Coeur d'Alene nearly seven weeks later, and he was arrested in conjunction with her kidnapping. When the authorities rescued Shasta, she told them that Duncan said that he was bringing her back to her father because Duncan had changed his mind about killing her. She further said that Duncan stated that she taught him how to love. Dylan's remains were found days later in a remote area near St. Regis, Montana. Duncan was subsequently charged with murdering Dylan as well as the three victims in Coeur d'Alene.

During his incarceration, authorities connected Duncan with the unsolved murders of Anthony Martinez in California and two girls in Seattle, which all occurred during Duncan's parole from 1994 to 1997. Of those murders, Duncan was charged only in the California case. In all, Duncan was convicted in Idaho for kidnapping and murdering the three victims in Coeur d'Alene, for which he was given six life sentences; in federal court for kidnapping Shasta and Dylan Groene and murdering Dylan, for which he was given three death sentences and three life sentences; and in the state of California for kidnapping and murdering Martinez, for which he was given two life sentences.

In March 2021, it was reported that Duncan was suffering from a terminal brain tumor. Court filings revealed he underwent brain surgery in October 2020 after being diagnosed with glioblastoma—stage IV brain cancer. He declined treatment from either chemotherapy or radiation therapy. In November 2020, medical staff at the Federal Bureau of Prisons estimated he had between six and twelve months left to live. Duncan died on March 28, 2021, at the age of 58.

Early life and criminal history
Joseph Edward Duncan III was born in Fort Bragg, North Carolina, on February 25, 1963. He was the fourth of five children born to Joseph Edward Duncan Jr and Lillian Mae Duncan. He had three older sisters and a younger brother. Duncan's father was in the United States Army, and because of this the family moved from city to city both within the U.S. and abroad, changing locations every year or two until the elder Duncan retired to Tacoma, Washington. Duncan's mother was described as a domineering woman, but although he claimed after being arrested in 1980 to have been abused as a child, his younger brother disputed this. Duncan's parents divorced in 1979. His sisters soon left the household and Duncan remained behind with his mother, while his brother went to live with their father. His father would later remarry, giving Duncan a stepfamily. Duncan attended Lakes High School but did not graduate.

Duncan had a long history as a violent sexual predator. He committed his first recorded sex crime in 1978, when he was 15 years old. In that incident, he raped a 9-year-old boy at gunpoint. The following year, he was arrested for driving a stolen car. He was sentenced as a juvenile and sent to the Jessie Dyslin Boys Ranch in Tacoma, where, according to a report by the Associated Press, he told a therapist assigned to his case that he had bound and sexually assaulted six boys. He also told the therapist that he estimated that he had raped 13 younger boys by the time he was aged 16.

In 1980, Duncan stole a number of guns from a neighbor and abducted a 14-year-old boy, raping him at gunpoint. He was sentenced to 20 years in prison for this crime, but was released on parole in 1994 after serving 14 years. While out on parole, Duncan is known to have lived in several places in the Seattle area. He was arrested again in 1996—this time for marijuana use—and released on parole several weeks later with new restrictions. Authorities believe that Duncan murdered Sammiejo White and Carmen Cubias in Seattle in 1996 and Anthony Martinez in Riverside County, California, in 1997, during his parole period; however, both those cases went cold and were not tied to Duncan until after his arrest in the Groene case. Duncan was arrested in Missouri and returned to prison in 1997 after violating the terms of his parole; he was released from prison on July 14, 2000, with time off for good behavior and moved to Fargo, North Dakota.

In March 2005, Duncan was charged with the July 3, 2004, molestation of two boys at a playground in Detroit Lakes, Minnesota. On April 5, 2005, he appeared before a Becker County judge, who set bail at US$15,000. A Fargo businessman, with whom Duncan had become acquainted, helped him post bail. However, Duncan skipped bail and disappeared. On June 1, a federal warrant was issued for Duncan's arrest on the charge of "unlawful flight to avoid prosecution."

Idaho murders and kidnappings
On May 16, 2005, authorities discovered the bodies of Brenda Groene, 40; her boyfriend, Mark McKenzie, 37; and her son, Slade Groene, 13, in their home along Lake Coeur d'Alene, outside the city of Coeur d'Alene, Idaho. Two of Brenda's other childrenDylan, 9, and Shasta, 8were missing. An AMBER Alert was issued and searchers combed the area for the missing children while authorities investigated the deaths at the home as homicides. Autopsies determined the cause of death to be "blunt trauma to the head"; authorities also noted that the victims had been bound.

Seven weeks later, in the early morning hours of July 2, 2005, Shasta was seen at a Denny's restaurant in Coeur d'Alene in the company of an unknown man. A waitress, manager, and two customers at the restaurant recognized the girl from media reports. They surreptitiously called police and positioned themselves to prevent the man from leaving. Police officers arrived at the restaurant and arrested the man, later identified as Duncan, without incident. Shasta identified herself to a waitress at the restaurant and to authorities, and was taken to Kootenai Medical Center for medical treatment and to be reunited with her father. Coeur d'Alene police, meanwhile, detained Duncan on kidnapping charges and on his outstanding federal warrant.

When Shasta was found without Dylan, authorities held little hope of finding the boy alive. Police asked the public for tips, specifically with respect to sightings of the stolen red Jeep Cherokee with Missouri license plates that Duncan was driving at the time of his arrest. Authorities discovered that Duncan had rented the car in Minnesota and never returned it. The employee suspected the girl wandering around the station might have been Shasta, but did not confront her as nothing appeared out of the ordinary. The employee and her manager notified authorities after reviewing surveillance camera footage and identifying Duncan and Shasta in the video.

On July 4, 2005, investigators found human remains at a remote makeshift campsite in the Lolo National Forest near St. Regis, Montana. The remains were sent to the FBI lab in Quantico, Virginia, for DNA testing and were positively identified as those of Dylan. During the trial it emerged that Duncan shot Dylan at point-blank range by holding a sawed-off 12-gauge shotgun to his head.

Groene family murders
Much of what is known about the murders of the Groene family was revealed by Shasta Groene herself. According to Shasta's police interview, Duncan killed her mother, older brother, and her mother's fiancé, and then kidnapped her and her brother, driving away with them in the stolen Jeep Cherokee.

Shasta told investigators her mother came into Dylan’s and her room and woke them up. Her mother said “someone is in the house” and they went into the living room, where she saw Duncan wearing black gloves and holding a gun. Duncan tied her mother's hands with nylon zip ties and did the same to her mother's fiancé and her brother Slade. Shasta and Dylan were removed from the house and placed outside on the lawn. While she waited with her brother, she heard multiple thumping sounds coming from inside the home. She then saw her injured older brother staggering away from the entrance to the home. Duncan then bludgeoned the three to death; neither Shasta nor Dylan witnessed the murders. Shasta did see Duncan repeatedly bludgeon her older brother; he was slumped over on the ground when Duncan moved both Shasta and Dylan to the car. Both children were taken to other locations, where they were repeatedly molested and tortured for six weeks. Shasta stated that they drove a long distance and stayed in two different campsites, where Duncan told her of having beaten her family members to death with a hammer.

Shasta also told investigators how Dylan was murdered. Duncan insisted that his death was an accident. Initially, Shasta was standing on the other side of Duncan's Jeep when she heard a loud boom. She then ran to the other side of the Jeep and saw Dylan lying on the ground screaming. Duncan was apparently digging through a clear plastic box looking for beer when a shotgun that was also kept in the box went off, hitting Dylan in the stomach. Shasta said that she then saw Duncan put the shotgun to Dylan's head and pull the trigger, but it failed to fire. While Dylan begged Duncan not to kill him, he reloaded the shotgun, put it back to the boy's head and pulled the trigger; Dylan was killed instantly. According to Shasta, immediately after killing Dylan, Duncan started crying and told her that he only killed him to put him out of his misery. A public memorial service was held for Dylan on July 16, 2005, which would have been his tenth birthday, at Real Life Ministries.

Shasta reported that Duncan nearly killed her days after killing Dylan. She said he gave her the choice to be killed either by strangulation or with a gun. Shasta chose the former, and Duncan proceeded to wrap a rope around her neck and pull it tight. However, Shasta begged Duncan to stop, using his nickname "Jet", and he immediately did. He then asked her if she would like to meet his mother, to which she responded yes, and the two drove back towards Coeur d'Alene and stopped at the Denny's restaurant where Shasta was rescued.

Other crimes
Duncan's arrest led the FBI to launch a nationwide review of unsolved missing child cases. He was implicated as a possible suspect in several crimes that occurred between 1994 and 1997, when he was on parole, and between 2000 and 2005, when he was free from prison. Although he was cleared as a suspect in some cases, authorities in California and Washington had enough evidence to believe Duncan had committed unsolved murders in their jurisdictions.

Anthony Martinez
On April 4, 1997, 10-year-old Anthony Michael Martinez was playing with friends in the front yard of his home in Beaumont, California, when an unknown man approached the group asking for help in finding a missing cat. When the boys refused, the man grabbed Martinez at knifepoint and threw him into his vehicle. After a two-week search, Martinez's body was found nude and partially decomposed in Indio, California, on April 19. Investigators noted that he had been sexually assaulted and bound with duct tape. Although a composite sketch of the suspect was made available and a partial fingerprint taken from the duct tape found on Martinez's body, the case eventually went cold.

In July 2005, bloggers noticed similarities between Duncan and the composite sketch in the Martinez case, as well as between Duncan's vehicle and the one Martinez's assailant was driving. The FBI and National Center for Missing and Exploited Children became involved, and in turn contacted Riverside County authorities. Riverside authorities were able to match the fingerprint taken from Martinez's body to Duncan, and on August 3 the Riverside County Sheriff's Department officially announced Duncan's connection with the Martinez case. FBI agents reported that Duncan confessed to the murder in an interview on July 19, 2005, describing the crime as “revenge against society again for sending him back to jail for a probation violation."

Sammiejo White and Carmen Cubias
After her rescue, Shasta told investigators that Duncan had told her about other crimes he had committed, including the Martinez murder and the 1996 murders of Sammiejo White, aged 11, and her half-sister Carmen Cubias, aged 9, who both vanished on July 6, 1996, after leaving the Crest Motel in Seattle. Their skeletal remains were found on February 10, 1998, in Bothell, Washington. Duncan confessed to beating the two young girls to death.

Trials
Duncan had been convicted in three courts: in Idaho district court, for the kidnapping and murders of Brenda and Slade Groene and Mark McKenzie; the United States District Court for the District of Idaho, for the kidnapping of Shasta and Dylan Groene, the murder of Dylan Groene, and other crimes; and a California superior court, for the kidnapping and murder of Anthony Martinez.

Idaho
Duncan first appeared in a Kootenai County court on July 13, 2005, where he was charged with three counts of first-degree murder and three counts of first-degree kidnapping, all in conjunction with the deaths of Brenda and Slade Groene and Mark McKenzie. County prosecutors had initially planned to charge Duncan with the kidnappings of Shasta and Dylan; however, they deferred those charges to the federal courts, as transporting children across state lines for the purpose of sexual exploitation is a federal offense. Trial was set to begin on January 17, 2006, but was delayed until April 4, after the district judge granted a request to the defense for more time to prepare for the trial, and then again to October 26, after the judge in the case stated that, "No one wants to try this case twice, including me." Duncan's attorneys blamed the multiple postponements on the prosecution's insistence on pursuing the death penalty.

On October 16, 2006, shortly after jury selection began, Kootenai County prosecutors and Duncan's attorney reached a plea bargain in which Duncan pleaded guilty to all state charges against him. He was immediately sentenced to three consecutive life sentences without the possibility of parole for the three kidnapping charges. Sentencing on the three murder charges was continued pending the outcome of his federal trial on kidnapping and murder charges; the judge said that if he did not receive the death penalty on the federal charges, he would return to Kootenai County for a death penalty phase on the state murder charges. Over two years later, after being sentenced to death on federal charges, Kootenai County sentenced Duncan to three additional life sentences. Duncan also agreed to cooperate with Kootenai County sheriff's detectives investigating his crimes and provide passwords to encrypted files stored on his computer.

Federal
On January 18, 2007, Duncan was indicted by a federal grand jury in Coeur d'Alene on ten counts of "kidnapping, kidnapping resulting in death, aggravated sexual abuse of a minor, and sexual exploitation of a child resulting in death," and other crimes related to illegal firearm possession and vehicle theft. He was arraigned the following day at a federal court in Boise, where a judge ordered Duncan to stand trial the following March. Duncan's defense attorneys immediately requested a postponement, which was granted the week the trial was originally scheduled to begin; a new trial date was set for January 22, 2008.

On December 3, 2007, Duncan pleaded guilty to all ten charges against him. As a condition of the agreement, Shasta Groene would not have to testify in the penalty phase of the trial. Due to a gag order, other details of the plea agreement were not released.

Jury selection for the penalty phase for Duncan's federal trial began on April 14, 2008. During jury selection, Duncan dismissed his attorneys and chose to represent himself. His attorneys objected, asserting he was not competent to do so, and requested a formal hearing as to the issue. The district court ordered an evaluation of Duncan to determine his competence, and accepted the evaluator's conclusion that he was competent to proceed without counsel.

On August 27, 2008, after three hours of deliberation, the jury recommended the death penalty, and the judge imposed three death sentences for "kidnapping resulting in death, sexual exploitation of a child resulting in death, and use of a firearm in a violent crime resulting in death," all related to the death of Dylan Groene. On November 3, 2008, Duncan was sentenced to an additional three consecutive terms of life without parole in federal prison for kidnapping Shasta Groene and for sexually abusing Shasta and Dylan.

Duncan's standby counsel filed a notice of appeal. Duncan subsequently wrote the court and informed it that any appeal was taken "against his wishes". In July 2011, the Ninth Circuit Court of Appeals reversed the district court's decision to permit Duncan to represent himself without first holding a hearing as to his competence to do so and remanded for a hearing as to this issue.

Beginning in September 2012, Duncan was incarcerated at the United States Penitentiary, Terre Haute in Indiana. On December 6, 2013, a federal judge ruled that he was mentally competent when he gave up the right to appeal his death sentence. Psychiatrists working with the prosecution diagnosed Duncan with pedophilia, sadistic personality disorder and antisocial personality disorder with narcissistic traits, but maintained that he was legally sane.

A three-judge panel of the Ninth Circuit U.S. Court of Appeals ruled on March 27, 2015, that a district judge correctly determined that Duncan was mentally competent when he waived his right to appeal his death sentence. On February 28, 2016, the United States Supreme Court denied Duncan's petition to hear his appeal of a federal judge's ruling in December 2013, which had been affirmed by the Ninth Circuit.

On February 28, 2017, a Petition for Writ of Habeas Corpus was filed. On September 27, 2017, it was ordered that the Government's Third Motion for Extension of Time was granted in part and denied in part. The Government's response was due October 30, 2017. The Petitioner's reply was due on or before January 30, 2018.

California
On January 18, 2007, the same day Duncan was indicted in federal court, Riverside County officials announced that he was charged with Martinez's murder. Despite attempts by Riverside County officials to extradite Duncan to California, including an appeal by Governor Arnold Schwarzenegger, Duncan's federal trial proceeded. He was eventually extradited to California on January 24, 2009, five months after being sentenced to death by the federal court.

On March 15, 2011, Duncan pleaded guilty to Martinez's murder, and was sentenced to two life terms on April 5, 2011. As part of a plea deal, the sentence came without the possibility of parole or right to appeal. Although Duncan could have faced a separate death sentence in addition to the ones he had already been sentenced to in federal court, Riverside County District Attorney Paul Zellerbach justified the life sentence by stating that he had consulted with the Martinez family who wanted closure in the case and that "the federal system will kill him long before the state of California would have seriously considered it."

"The Fifth Nail" and "Fifth Nail Revelations"
Prior to his arrest for murder, Duncan maintained a personal website, titled "The Fifth Nail". According to lore, in addition to the four nails used to pierce the body of Jesus Christ in his crucifixion, there was a fifth nail that was taken away and hidden by the Romans. Duncan adopted the name for his own website and blog. On the website, which depicted Duncan's day-to-day life as a convicted sex offender, he denied being a pedophile and claimed to have been sexually abused as a child.

After being imprisoned, Duncan maintained a Blogspot website titled "Joseph E. Duncan III returns to the web from Federal death row to expose the meaning of the Fifth Nail". All the content on the site was posted by someone called Silenced, who presumably received letters from Duncan to post on the site on his behalf.

John Adams, Duncan's public defender in Kootenai County, and prosecutor Bill Douglas declined to comment on the possibility that Duncan was blogging from prison. Inmates do not have access to the internet, and while outgoing letters are scanned for requests for contraband or for help in planning an escape, they are not read word for word.

Aftermath
The jurors who imposed the death penalty on Duncan were offered counseling in order for them to cope with the horrific evidence they had to see during the trial. Among the evidence viewed in court was a 33-minute video depicting a nude Duncan torturing, physically and verbally assaulting, and sexually abusing a nude, restrained boy identified as Dylan Groene. The video showed this abuse conducted in various interior areas of what appeared to be a dilapidated, single-level wooden shed or small cabin. Other evidence included human remains, a wire noose (from the cabin interior), and other videos of Duncan's continued torture of Dylan. During one of the videos, a child could be heard screaming in pain while a naked Duncan shouted, "The devil is here, boy, the devil himself … The devil likes to watch children suffer and cry!".

Petition for Slade and Dylan's law
In 2016, Shasta Groene (then 19 years old) started a petition called Slade and Dylan's law in honor of her two brothers whom Duncan had murdered. In the petition description, she stated that convicted sex offenders should not be let out of jail. This would effectively mean that the three-strike rule for violent sex offenders be reduced to one strike. By the time the petition closed, it had 51,820 supporters.

Death
In October 2020, Duncan underwent brain surgery after he was diagnosed with glioblastoma. He declined any treatment and rejected chemotherapy and radiation therapy. Medical staff at the Federal Bureau of Prisons estimated he had between six and twelve months left to live. He died on March 28, 2021, at the age of 58. His body was cremated.

See also
 Kidnapping of Jayme Closs (2018), during which Jake Patterson confessed to murdering a family in order to kidnap the 13-year-old girl
 List of serial killers in the United States

References

External links
 Duncan investigation, trial, sentencing  – a collection of The Spokesman-Review articles on the Groene case
 Blogging the Fifth Nail, subject's weblog

1963 births
2021 deaths
20th-century American criminals
21st-century American criminals
American bloggers
American kidnappers
American murderers of children
American people convicted of child sexual abuse
American people convicted of murder
American people who died in prison custody
American prisoners sentenced to death
American prisoners sentenced to life imprisonment
American rapists
American serial killers
Criminals from Tacoma, Washington
Deaths from brain cancer in the United States
Deaths from glioblastoma
Inmates of ADX Florence
Kidnappings in the United States
Male serial killers
Murder in Riverside County, California
People convicted of murder by California
People convicted of murder by Idaho
People convicted of murder by the United States federal government
People convicted under the Federal Kidnapping Act
People extradited within the United States
People with antisocial personality disorder
People with sadistic personality disorder
Prisoners sentenced to death by the United States federal government
Prisoners sentenced to life imprisonment by California
Prisoners sentenced to life imprisonment by Idaho
Prisoners who died in United States federal government detention
Serial killers who died in prison custody